Captain Kronos – Vampire Hunter is a 1974 British swashbuckling action horror film, written and directed by Brian Clemens, produced by Clemens and Albert Fennell for Hammer Film Productions, and starring Horst Janson, John Carson, Shane Briant, and Caroline Munro. The music score was composed by Laurie Johnson, supervised by Philip Martell. Belatedly released on 7 April 1974, the film was intended as the first in a series focused on the title character and his companions. Due to the film's violence and sexual subtext, Captain Kronos was rated R in North America. This was Clemens' only film as a director.

Plot
Dr. Marcus (John Carson) calls in Captain Kronos (Horst Janson), his Army Brother, to his village which is plagued by mysterious deaths marked by highly accelerated aging. Kronos and his companion, the hunchback Professor Hieronymus Grost (John Cater), are professional vampire hunters. Grost explains to the initially skeptical Marcus that the dead women are victims of a vampire who drains not blood but youth, and that there are "as many species of vampire as there are beasts of prey". The discovery of another victim confirms Grost's explanation. Along the way, Kronos and Grost take in a local Gypsy girl, Carla (Caroline Munro), who had been sentenced to the stocks for dancing on the Sabbath. She repays them by helping them hunt the vampire; she later becomes Kronos's lover.

Grost and Kronos conduct a mystical test that indicates the presence of vampires. Their findings are contradicted by an eyewitness who claims to have seen "someone old, very old", whereas a youth-draining vampire should appear youthful.

Marcus visits the family of his late friend, Lord Hagen Durward, and speaks with Durward's son, Paul (Shane Briant), and his beautiful sister Sara (Lois Daine). He must leave before speaking with the bed-ridden Lady Durward (Wanda Ventham). While riding through the woods, Marcus encounters a cloaked figure that leaves him shaken, and he finds blood on his lips.

At a tavern, Kronos defeats thugs led by Kerro (Ian Hendry), who were hired by Lady Durward's coachman to murder him. Kronos, Grost, Marcus and Carla set up a network of alarm bells in the woods to announce the passage of vampires. Meanwhile, a large bat attacks and kills a young woman. Marcus realises that he has become a vampire and begs Kronos to kill him. After various methods (including impalement with a stake and hanging) fail, Kronos accidentally pierces Marcus's chest with a cross of steel that Marcus had been wearing round his neck.

Having thus determined the vampire's weakness, Kronos and Grost obtain an iron cross from a cemetery. They are accosted by angry villagers, who believe that they murdered Marcus. Grost forges the cross into a sword, while Kronos conducts a knightly vigil. After seeing the Durward carriage flee the scene of a vampire attack, Kronos suspects Sara as the vampire.

Carla seeks refuge at Durward Manor to distract the household while Kronos sneaks inside.  The "bedridden" Lady Durward reveals herself as the newly-youthful vampire, and she hypnotises Carla and the Durward siblings. Lady Durward has raised her husband Hagen (William Hobbs) from the grave. She offers the mesmerised Carla to her husband, but Kronos erupts from hiding. Kronos uses the new sword's mirrored blade to turn Lady Durward's hypnotic gaze against her. He kills Lord Durward in a duel, and then destroys Lady Durward.

The next day, Kronos bids Carla goodbye, before he and Grost ride on to new adventures.

Cast

 Horst Janson as Captain Kronos
 Julian Holloway as the voice of Captain Kronos
 John Cater as Professor Hieronymus Grost
 Caroline Munro as Carla
 John Carson as Dr. Marcus
 Shane Briant as Paul Durward
 Lois Daine as Sara Durward
 Wanda Ventham as Lady Durward
 Ian Hendry as Kerro
 William Hobbs as Hagen
 Paul Greenwood as Giles
 Lisa Collings as Vanda Sorell
 Brian Tully as George Sorell
 Robert James as Pointer
 Perry Soblosky as Barlow
 John Hollis as barman
 Susanna East as Isabella Sorell
 Stafford Gordon as Barton Sorell
 Elizabeth Dear as Ann Sorell
 Joanna Ross as Myra
 Neil Seiler as priest
 Olga Anthony as Lilian
 Gigi Gurpinar as blind girl
 Peter Davidson as big man
 Terence Sewards as Tom
 Trevor Lawrence as Deke
 Jacqui Cook as barmaid
 B. H. Barry, Michael Buchanan, Steve James, Ian McKay, Barry Smith, Roger Williams as villagers
 Linda Cunningham as Jane
 Caroline Villiers as Petra

Critical reception
AllMovie called the film "one of the last great Hammer Films productions". In later years, the film became a cult classic, largely because of its unusual mix of supernatural horror and swashbuckling action. It was supposed to launch a series of new Hammer film productions but, in the 1970s, the studio developed financial issues and closed down.

Novelisation
A novelisation of the film, written by Guy Adams under the title Kronos, was published in 2011 by Arrow Publishing, in association with Hammer and the Random House Group.

Comic book adaptations
 The House of Hammer #1-3 (Oct. 1976-Jan. 1977), by Steve Moore and Ian Gibson — a "sequel" rather than an adaptation
 Hammer's Halls of Horror #20 (May 1978), by Steve Moore and Steve Parkhouse
 Captain Kronos — Vampire Hunter #1-4 (Titan Comics, Oct. 2017 - [Jan.] 2018), by Dan Abnett and Tom Mandrake

See also
Vampire films
List of vampire films

References

External links
 
 
 

1974 films
British historical horror films
Films shot at EMI-Elstree Studios
Hammer Film Productions horror films
1974 horror films
1970s fantasy adventure films
British fantasy adventure films
1970s historical horror films
British action horror films
British vampire films
Films shot in England
Films set in England
Films adapted into comics
Films set in country houses
British historical fantasy films
Films scored by Laurie Johnson
British exploitation films
British supernatural horror films
1970s English-language films
1970s British films